Michal Seidler (born 5 April 1990), is a Czech futsal player who plays for SK Interobal Plzeň and the Czech Republic national futsal team.

References

External links

1990 births
Living people
Futsal forwards
Czech men's futsal players